The Australian national under-18 and under-19 basketball team is the junior men's basketball side that represents Australia in international under-18 and under-19 youth basketball competitions. Nicknamed the Emus, the team is governed by the Australian Basketball Federation Inc. The Emus' greatest accomplishment was winning the 2003 FIBA Under-19 World Cup.

Current roster
Final 12-man roster for the 2021 FIBA Under-19 Basketball World Cup.

Head coaches
  Adam Caporn - 2015
  Darren Perry - 2018–present

See also

 Australia men's national basketball team
 Australia women's national basketball team
 Australia women's national under-19 basketball team
 Australia men's national wheelchair basketball team
 Australia women's national wheelchair basketball team
 Australia national under-17 basketball team

References

External links
 Basketball Australia official website
 FIBA.com profile

Men's national under-19 basketball teams
National youth sports teams of Australia